Osvaldo Ardiles Haay (born 1 May 1997) is an Indonesian professional footballer who plays as a forward for Liga 1 club Persija Jakarta and the Indonesia national team.

Club career

Persipura Jayapura
Osvaldo Haay in 2016 at the age of 18 earned a spot in Persipura Jayapura's senior team that competed in the 2016 Indonesia Soccer Championship A. Starting in a match against Arema Cronus F.C., Haay scored his first goal in a professional game on 24 October 2016.

Persebaya Surabaya
As a rising star, Haay received offers from several clubs for the 2018 Liga 1 competition. He chose to play for Persebaya in the East Java provincial capital of Surabaya where he made 41 league appearances and scored 16 goals in two consecutive seasons.

Persija Jakarta
Haay in 2020 signed a contract with affluent Liga 1 club Persija Jakarta for the 2020 Liga 1 season that only lasted for three matches due to the COVID-19 pandemic. He stayed with Persija for the 2021 Menpora Cup, a prelude tournament for Liga 1 teams ahead of the 2021 season. Persija won that tournament with Haay scoring a goal and delivering an assist in the final match.

International career
Haay made his international senior debut for Indonesia on 21 March 2017, against Myanmar, where he came as a substitute. He scored his debut goal on 4 December 2017, against Mongolia. Haay was part of the Indonesia under-23 national team that won silver in the 2019 Southeast Asian Games in the Philippines, in which he was the top goalscorer with eight goals.

Personal life
Haay's mother, Buanitawati, is a Javanese from the East Java region of Banyuwangi while his father, Edison Haay, is a native of Papua, where the family resides. Notwithstanding the fact that he was born and bred in Papua, Haay understands some Javanese language from his mother that became handy when the footballer played in Surabaya, East Java's capital. Osvaldo is a devout Christian with tattoos of crosses to show. Haay has two brothers, Jefry Haay and Jeremiah Denilson Haay.
Haay is married to Shella Pricilia. The couple had their wedding on 27 February 2021.

Career statistics

Club

International

International under-23 goals

Honours

Club
Persipura Jayapura
 Indonesia Soccer Championship A: 2016
Persebaya Surabaya
 Indonesia President's Cup runner-up: 2019
Persija Jakarta

 Menpora Cup: 2021

International 
Indonesia U-23
 Southeast Asian Games  Bronze medal: 2017
 Southeast Asian Games  Silver medal: 2019
 AFF U-22 Youth Championship: 2019
Indonesia
 Aceh World Solidarity Cup runner-up: 2017

Individual
 Liga 1 Best Young Player: 2018
 Liga 1 Best Eleven: 2018
 Menpora Cup Best Eleven: 2021

References

External links
 Osvaldo Haay at pssi.org
 
 
 

Living people
1998 births
Javanese people
Papuan people
People from Jayapura
Indonesian footballers
Association football wingers
Association football fullbacks
Persipura Jayapura players
Persebaya Surabaya players
Persija Jakarta players
Liga 1 (Indonesia) players
Indonesia youth international footballers
Indonesia international footballers
Southeast Asian Games bronze medalists for Indonesia
Southeast Asian Games medalists in football
Competitors at the 2017 Southeast Asian Games
Competitors at the 2019 Southeast Asian Games
Southeast Asian Games silver medalists for Indonesia
Sportspeople from Papua
21st-century Indonesian people